The women's 10,000 metres competition at the 2018 Asian Games took place on 25 August 2018 at the Gelora Bung Karno Stadium.

Schedule
All times are Western Indonesia Time (UTC+07:00)

Records

Results

 Sanjivani Jadhav of India originally finished ninth, but due to the positive result of the test for probenecid, the Athletics Integrity Unit declared to invalidate all results achieved from 29 June 2018 by her.

References

External links
Results

Women's 10,000 metres
2018 Women